Lucile is an unincorporated community in Early and Miller counties, in the U.S. state of Georgia.

History
A post office called Lucile was established in 1899, and remained in operation until 1903. An early variant name was "Racketville". The present name is after Lucille Middleton, the daughter of the local postmaster.

References

Unincorporated communities in Early County, Georgia
Unincorporated communities in Miller County, Georgia
Unincorporated communities in Georgia (U.S. state)